Walker Township is a township in Huntingdon County, Pennsylvania, United States. The population was 1,982 at the 2020 census. The township includes the village of McConnellstown.

History
The Robb Farm was listed on the National Register of Historic Places in 2011.

Geography
According to the United States Census Bureau, the township has a total area of 18.8 square miles (48.6 km2), all  land.

Adjacent municipalities
All municipalities are located in Huntingdon County unless otherwise noted.
Juniata Township
Smithfield Township
Porter Township
Penn Township
Woodbury Township, Blair County

Demographics

As of the census of 2010, there were 1,947 people and 773 households within the township.  The population density was 103.6 people per square mile (40.0/km2).  There were 874 housing units at an average density of 46.5/sq mi (17.9/km2).  The racial makeup of the township was 98.36% White, 0.15% African American, 0.15% Native American, 0.67% Asian, and 0.67% from two or more races. Hispanic or Latino of any race were 0.51% of the population.

There were 773 households, out of which 32.1% had children under the age of 18 living with them, 65.9% were married couples living together, 7.5% had a female householder with no husband present, and 23.3% were non-families. 20.1% of all households were made up of individuals, and 11.4% had someone living alone who was 65 years of age or older.  The average household size was 2.56 and the average family size was 2.94.

In the township the population was spread out, with 23.3% under the age of 18, 2.1% from 18 to 19, 3.2% from 20 to 24, 8.8% from 25 to 34, 21.8% from 35 to 49, 22.6% from 50 to 64, and 18.2% who were 65 years of age or older.  The median age was 40 years. The population was 48.84% male, and 51.16% female.

Recreation
A portion of the Pennsylvania State Game Lands Number 118 is located on Tussey Mountain in the western end of the township.

References

External links
Walker Township

Townships in Huntingdon County, Pennsylvania
Townships in Pennsylvania